The Business and Financial Times (B&FT) is a Ghanaian privately owned newspaper which focuses on reporting business news from Ghana and across the African continent. The newspaper is popularly known as the B&FT, it has a nationwide coverage and a readership of about 309, 000 as reported by Geopoll's ranking of nationwide top newspapers. Its mainly noted for its coverage on issues about the banking sector, local and international trade, the oil and gas sector and that of the macro and micro economy.

See also 
List of newspapers in Ghana
Media of Ghana
List of radio stations in Ghana
Telecommunications in Ghana
New Media in Ghana

References

External links